The 1980 Campeonato Nacional was Chilean football top tier's 48th season. Cobreloa was the tournament's champion, winning its first ever title.

League table

Results

Topscorers

Liguilla Pre-Copa Libertadores

Liguilla Play-off match 

Universidad de Chile qualified to 1981 Copa Libertadores

Promotion/relegation Liguilla

See also 
 1980 Copa Polla Gol

References

External links 
ANFP 
RSSSF Chile 1980

Primera División de Chile seasons
Chile
Pri